The Bad Girl's Guide is an American sitcom starring Jenny McCarthy, Marcelle Larice, Christina Moore, Stephanie Childers, and Johnathan McClain. The series aired on UPN from May 24 to July 5, 2005.

The TV show was based on the best-selling Bad Girls Guides by Cameron Tuttle, who was the show's co-creator and co-executive producer.

Cast
Jenny McCarthy as JJ
Marcelle Larice as Holly
Johnathan McClain as Patric
Stephanie Childers as Irene 
Christina Moore as Sarah

Episodes

References

External links
 

UPN original programming
2000s American sitcoms
2005 American television series debuts
2005 American television series endings
English-language television shows
Television series by CBS Studios
Television shows based on books